The Phragmoxenidiaceae are a family of fungi in the order Tremellales. Only a single species from central and northern Europe is known, Phragmoxenidium mycophilum.

References

Tremellomycetes
Basidiomycota families
Monogeneric fungus families
Taxa named by Franz Oberwinkler
Taxa described in 1990